This is a list of notable alumni related to the University of Allahabad and its constituent colleges. Excluded from this list are those people whose only connection with Allahabad University is that they were awarded an honorary degree.

Padma award recipient alumni
Mahadevi Verma
Bhagwati Charan Verma
Raghupati Sahay, also known as Firaq Gorakhpuri
Vidya Niwas Mishra
 Murali Manohar Joshi
 B. D. Pande

Arts

Humanities and social sciences

Law

Milon K. Banerji, attorney general for India

Literature and journalism

Doodhnath Singh – Hindi writer and critic
Harivansh Rai Bachchan – Famous hindi poet and father of Amitabh Bachchan.
Prabhat Nalini Das – public intellectual and Professor; Head, English Department, Lady Shri Ram College; First Director-Dean, Humanities, IIT Kanpur; Founder-Professor and Head, Department of English, Lady Shri Ram College, Delhi University; Pro Vice Chancellor, NEHU-Kohima Campus; English
Gopinath Kaviraj – philosopher; Sanskrit scholar
Vibhuti Narain Rai renowned writer and novelist, former Director General of Police of Uttar Pradesh, former Vice Chancellor of Mahatma Gandhi Antarrashtriya Hindi Vishwavidyalaya.
Prem Chand Pandey – founding director of the National Centre for Polar and Ocean Research; recipient of SSB Prize
Ibn-e-Safi, Jasosi writer
Mohammad Uzair, Sitara-i-Imtiaz
Rafiq Hussain, Urdu writer, poet, academic, author, head of Urdu Department Allahabad University
Dharamvir Bharati, writer
Kamleshwar, writer
Mrinal Pande, writer
Neelum Saran Gour, author and academic
Govind Mishra, Hindi writer and former chairman of CBDT
Ravindra Khattree, statistician, academic, author
Acharya Narendra Dev
Chandradhar Sharma Guleri, writer
Krishna Kumar Sharma, Quit India Movement activist, poet and literary figure
Fani Badayuni Urdu poet.
Yagyadutt Sharma, Hindi novelist, writer and poet
Ram Chandra Shukla, painter
Surya Bahadur Thapa
Daulat Singh Kothari, physicist
Harish Chandra, mathematician
Pankaj Mishra, author
Lakshmi Raj Sharma, author and academician
K. Banerjee, physicist and ex-Director of Indian Association for the Cultivation of Science
Leema Dhar, author, poet and columnist

Military

Politics

Heads of state and  government

Others

Vinod Kumar Yadav, IRSEE officer and Chairman of the Indian Railways Board
Jagmohan Yadav, IPS, former Director General of Uttar Pradesh Police.
Rajju Bhaiya, Ex-RSS Chief
Murli Manohar Joshi, former Minister of Home Affairs and Minister of Human Resource Development
Janeshwar Mishra, Ex-Minister Govt. of India
Sir Syed Wazir Hasan, Chief Justice of Awadh Chief Court
Mohan Singh, National General secretary, Samajwadi Party
Ram Niwas Mirdha, former cabinet minister
Dharmendra Yadav, Member of the Lok Sabha
N. C. Saxena, IAS Officer, member of Planning Commission of India
Alok Kumar, IPS Officer
(Rakesh Kumar Jain, MSc Botany 1971 IRS(CE)(1976) Vice chairman & Member Settlement Commission, CGST & Customs

Science and technology

Sports

Others

Maharishi Mahesh Yogi, known for Transcendental Meditation
Uttar Kumar, film actor
M. A. Ansari, pre-partition Royal Indian Navy Education Officer
Udit Raj, social activist
Vivek Sahai, former Chairman Railway Board

 Vivek Srivastava, Managing Director, Innocean Worldwide India Pvt. Ltd. a leading multinational brand communication & advertising firm

See also
 List of people associated with Allahabad
 Allahabad

References

Notes

Citations

 
University of Allahabad alumni
People by university or college in Uttar Pradesh
Allahabad